Kurichvedu is a village in Prakasam district of the Indian state of Andhra Pradesh. It is the mandal headquarters of Kurichedu mandal in Kandukur revenue division.

References 

Villages in Prakasam district
Mandal headquarters in Prakasam district